Elections to the Estonian Constituent Assembly were held on 3–4 February 1918. In some electoral districts, the elections were postponed until 9–10 February. During the October revolution, the Bolsheviks also took power in parts of Estonia, mostly in urban areas in Northern Estonia. Parts of Estonia were already occupied by Germany and the elections were not held in these areas.

The Russian Social Democratic Labour Party (Bolsheviks) allowed the elections to be held, in hope of getting a majority of the votes. However, they achieved only 37% of the votes, leaving a majority for parties that supported Estonian independence. The Estonian Constituent Assembly was never convened after these elections, because the Communists annulled the elections and Germany occupied the rest of Estonia in the same February. New elections to the Constituent Assembly were held in 1919.

Results

References

Parliamentary elections in Estonia
1918 in Estonia
Estonia
Independence of Estonia
Annulled elections
February 1918 events
Election and referendum articles with incomplete results